Mekteb-i Aşiret-i Humayun (Imperial Tribal School) or Aşiret Mektebi (عشيرت مكتبي) was an Istanbul school founded in 1892 by Abdulhamid II to promote the integration of tribes into the Ottoman empire through education.

The curriculum was heavily biased towards the teaching of religion, and it also had a strong emphasis on students learning the Ottoman Turkish language.

After graduation, students were expected to continue education at Mekteb-i Sultani (Imperial High School) and then at Mekteb-i Mulkiye (School of Civil Administration), in order to be able to serve the empire in their native region.

Initially only the sons of the Arab sheikhs and notables were permitted to enroll, however after petitioning by Albanian notables, in 1902 an imperial decree resulted in the enrollment of twenty students from the Albanian cities of Dibra, Elbasan, and Yanya.
Later Kurds were permitted to enroll also.

The school was closed in 1907.

References 

Educational institutions established in 1892
Educational institutions disestablished in 1907
Education in Istanbul
Education in the Ottoman Empire
Defunct schools in Turkey
1892 establishments in the Ottoman Empire
1907 disestablishments in the Ottoman Empire